Yasas Alwis (born 9 September 1992) is a Sri Lankan cricketer. He made his first-class debut for Nondescripts Cricket Club in the 2016–17 Premier League Tournament on 5 February 2017.

References

External links
 

1992 births
Living people
Sri Lankan cricketers
Nondescripts Cricket Club cricketers
Cricketers from Colombo